The following is a list of television series produced in Italy:

#
1992
1993
1994
48 ore
7 vite

A
Adrian (TV series)
Al di là del lago
AleX
Le ali della vita
All Stars
All'ultimo minuto
Amiche mie
Amico mio
Andata e ritorno
Angelo il custode
Anna
Anna e i cinque
Arriva Cristina
Arrivano i Rossi
Arsenio Lupin
Art with Mati and Dada
Le avventure di Laura Storm
L'avvocato delle donne
L'avvocato Porta

B
Baby
Balliamo e cantiamo con Licia
Belli dentro
Il bello delle donne
Il bene e il male
Benedetti dal Signore
Big Man
Boris
Brian O'Brian
Brivido Giallo
Braccialetti rossi
Buona la prima!
Butta la luna
Buttafuori

C
Caccia al Re - La narcotici
Call center
Camera Café
Il Capitano
Capri
Carabinieri
Caro maestro
Casa Cecilia
Casa dolce casa
Casa famiglia
Casa Pierpiero
Casa Vianello
Cascina Vianello
Un caso di coscienza
Caterina e le sue figlie
CentoVetrine
I Cesaroni
Che Dio ci aiuti
Chiamatemi Giò
Chiara e gli altri
Un ciclone in famiglia
I cinque del quinto piano
Classe di ferro
Club 57
Codice rosso
College
Commesse
Il commissario
Un commissario a Roma
Il commissario Corso
Il commissario De Vincenzi
Il commissario Manara
Il commissario Montalbano
Il commissario Rex
Compagni di scuola
Così fan tutte
Cotti e mangiati
Cri Cri
Crimini
Crimini bianchi
Cristina
Cristina, l'Europa siamo noi
Cugino & cugino
Cuore contro cuore

D
La Dama Velata
I delitti del cuoco
Dio vede e provvede
Disokkupati
Distretto di Polizia
Don Fumino
Don Luca
Don Luca c'è
Don Matteo
Don Tonino
Donna
Donna detective
Una donna per amico
Donne assassine
Door into Darkness
La dottoressa Giò
Due assi per un turbo
Le due facce dell'amore
Due per tre

E
Elisa di Rivombrosa
Eppur si muove
Extr@

F
La famiglia Benvenuti
Una famiglia in giallo
Fate: The Winx Saga
FBI - Francesco Bertolazzi investigatore
Felipe ha gli occhi azzurri
La figlia di Elisa - Ritorno a Rivombrosa
Finalmente soli
Finché c'è ditta c'è speranza
Fiore e Tinelli
Frammenti
Fratelli Benvenuti
Fratelli detective
Fuori corso
Fuoriclasse

G
Gawayn
Gente di mare
Giallo club. Invito al poliziesco
Giallo sera
Gino il pollo
Giornalisti
Il giovane Montalbano
Il giudice Mastrangelo
Gli incubi di Dario Argento
Gomorrah
Grandi domani

H
Hip Hop Hurrà
Ho sposato uno sbirro

I
I bastardi di Pizzofalcone
I-taliani
In tour
Incantesimo
Le inchieste del commissario Maigret
Intelligence - Servizi & segreti
InvaXön - Alieni nello spazio
Un inviato molto speciale
Io e la mamma
Io e mio figlio - Nuove storie per il commissario Vivaldi
L'isola
L'ispettore Coliandro
L'ispettore Giusti
Italian Restaurant

L
La ladra
Lady Oscar
La compagnia del cigno
La guerra è finita
Liberi tutti
I liceali
Licia dolce Licia
Life Bites - Pillole di vita
Linda e il brigadiere
Love Bugs
Love me Licia
 Lo zio d'America
Lucky Luke
Lui e lei

M
Ma il portiere non c'è mai?
Mammamia!
Il mammo
Il maresciallo Rocca
Max & Tux
Medici miei
Medicina generale
Un medico in famiglia
Melissa
Milano-Roma
I misteri di Cascina Vianello
Il mondo è meraviglioso
Muppet Show

N
Nati ieri
Nebbia in Val Padana
Nebbie e delitti
Noi siamo angeli
Non esiste più la mezza stagione
Non lasciamoci più
Non pensarci - La serie
Non smettere di sognare
Nonno Felice
Norma e Felice
NormalMan
La nuova squadra

O
Ognuno è perfetto
O la va, o la spacca
L'onore e il rispetto
OK, Il Prezzo e Giusto!
Operazione N.A.S.
Orgoglio
L'ottavo sigillo

P
Un passo dal cielo
Pazza famiglia
Il peccato e la vergogna
Persone sconosciute
La pietra di Marco Polo
Piloti (television series)
La piovra (miniseries)
Il Polpo
Una poltrona per due
Un prete tra noi
Professione fantasma
Pronto Emergenza
Provaci ancora prof

Q
Quei due sopra il varano
Quelli dell'intervallo
Quelli dell'Intervallo Cafe
Quelli della speciale
Questa casa non è un albergo
Questa è la mia terra
Qui squadra mobile

R
R.I.S. - Delitti imperfetti
R.I.S. Roma - Delitti imperfetti
Raccontami
Radio G.R.E.M.
I ragazzi del muretto
I ragazzi della 3ª C
I ragazzi di padre Tobia
Le ricette di Arturo e Kiwi
Ritorna il tenente Sheridan
Rome
Romanzo criminale - La serie
Le rose di Danzica
Rossella

S
Sangue caldo
Il segreto del Sahara
Sei forte, maestro
Sensualità a corte
Sheridan, squadra omicidi
I soliti idioti
Spazio 1999
Squadra antimafia - Palermo oggi
La squadra
La stagione dei delitti
Le stagioni del cuore
Stazione di servizio
Le storie di Farland
La strana coppia
Il supermercato
Sweet India
Suburra

T
Teneramente Licia
Tequila & Bonetti
Terapia d'urgenza
Terminenzio
Terra ribelle
Tracy e Polpetta
Il tredicesimo apostolo - Il prescelto
Le Tre Rose di Eva
Il triangolo rosso
Tua sorella
Turbo
Turno di notte
Tutti gli uomini sono uguali
Tutti pazzi per amore
Tutti per Bruno
TuttoTotò

U
Ugo
Un medico in famiglia
Un posto al sole
Uno di noi

V
Valentina
Valeria medico legale
La vedova e il piedipiatti
Vento di ponente
Via Zanardi 33
Vicini di casa
Il vigile urbano
Villa Arzilla

W
Winx Club
World of Winx

Z
Zanzibar
Zero
Lo zio d'America

Sitcoms

External links
 Italian TV at the Internet Movie Database

 
Italy
Series